The 1989 President's Cup International Football Tournament was the 18th competition of Korea Cup.

First round

Group A

Group B

Final round

See also
Korea Cup
South Korea national football team results

References

External links
President's Cup 1989 (South Korea) at RSSSF

Korea Cup
1989 in South Korean football